Vardenafil is a PDE5 inhibitor used for treating erectile dysfunction that is sold under the brand name Levitra among others.

Medical use

Vardenafil's indications and contraindications are the same as with other PDE5 inhibitors; it is closely related in function to sildenafil citrate (Viagra) and tadalafil (Cialis). The difference between the vardenafil molecule and sildenafil citrate is a nitrogen atom's position and the change of sildenafil's piperazine ring methyl group to an ethyl group. Tadalafil is structurally different from both sildenafil and vardenafil. Vardenafil's relatively short effective time is comparable to but somewhat longer than sildenafil's. Vardenafil also does not have an effect on PDE6, which means that it does not have vision adverse effects.

Beyond its indications for erectile dysfunction, vardenafil may be effective in the treatment of premature ejaculation, where it may significantly increase the time from penetration to ejaculation.

Adverse reactions
The common, adverse drug reactions (side effects) are the same as with other PDE5 inhibitors. The frequent vardenafil-specific side-effect is nausea; the infrequent side effects are abdominal pain, back pain, photosensitivity, abnormal vision, eye pain, facial edema, hypotension, palpitation, tachycardia, arthralgia, myalgia, rash, itch, and priapism.

One possibly serious, but rare, side effect with vardenafil is heart attack. Also, in rare cases, vardenafil use may cause priapism, a very painful emergency condition that can cause impotence if left untreated.

On 18 October 2007, the U.S. Food and Drug Administration (FDA) announced that a warning about possible deafness (sudden hearing loss) would be added to the drug labels of vardenafil, and other PDE5 inhibitors.

Interactions 

Vardenafil, as with all PDE5 inhibitors, should not be used by people taking nitrate medications or used with sexual enhancement drugs such as poppers, because combining them with vardenafil might provoke potentially life-threatening hypotension (low blood pressure).

Further, vardenafil causes lengthening of the QT interval. Therefore, it should not be taken by people taking other medications that affect the QT interval (such as amiodarone).

History
Vardenafil was co-marketed by Bayer Pharmaceuticals, GlaxoSmithKline, and Schering-Plough under the trade name Levitra. As of 2005, the co-promotion rights of GSK on Levitra have been returned to Bayer in many markets outside the U.S. In Italy, Bayer sells vardenafil as Levitra and GSK sells it as Vivanza.  Thus, because of European Union trade rules, parallel imports might result in Vivanza sold next to Levitra in the EU.

An orally disintegrating form, marketed as Staxyn and Levitra Soft, has been gaining approvals in countries such as the United States and Canada.

Dose forms

It is available in 2.5 mg, 5 mg, 10 mg, and 20 mg doses in round orange tablets. The normal starting dose is 10 mg (roughly equivalent to 50 mg of sildenafil). Vardenafil should be taken 1 to 2 hours prior to sexual activity, with a maximum dose frequency of once per day. In some territories, such as the UK, only certain doses may be available.

Vardenafil is also available under the name Staxyn as a tablet which dissolves on the tongue rather than being swallowed in the form of a pill.

Tainted supplements
The USFDA has found vardenafil and other synthetic PDE5 inhibitors in numerous products marketed as "herbal" supplements or "all natural" products for male enhancement.

References

External links 
 
 

Erectile dysfunction drugs
HERG blocker
Lactams
PDE5 inhibitors
Schering-Plough brands
GSK plc brands
Merck & Co. brands
Bayer brands
Phenol ethers
Piperazines
Sulfonamides